Boardman Township is one of the fourteen townships of Mahoning County, Ohio, United States. The population was 40,213 at the 2020 census. A suburb directly south of Youngstown, it is the second largest municipality in the Youngstown–Warren metropolitan area and is a major retail hub for the region.

History

The community of Boardman was founded by Elijah Boardman, a land agent of the Connecticut Land Company and later U.S. Senator, in the late 1790s as township 1, range 2 within the Connecticut Western Reserve. The township was formally established in 1806, although the township government lists it as 1805 on its seal, documents, and signage. It is the only Boardman Township statewide. Boardman was traditionally an agricultural community with grain crops and apple orchards throughout the 19th century. Around the turn of the century, the railroad led to Southern Park, a horse racing facility on Washington Boulevard. Thus, the area was an early draw for Youngstown urbanites. Because of its agricultural nature and proximity to Youngstown, Boardman was ripe for strip development starting as early as 1950. Around this time, the northern areas of the township were developed into suburban spillover from Youngstown's south side.

Edward J. DeBartolo Sr., a shopping mall developer from Youngstown, began his company in Boardman. Boardman Plaza on U.S. Route 224 was one of the first strip malls in the country. Established in 1950 by DeBartolo, the plaza had three full-service grocery stores within a few hundred feet of each other. Today one must travel at least  to get the same food service. Later, circa 1970, DeBartolo opened the more contemporary Southern Park Mall near the intersection of US 224 and Market Street. Also around 1950, the Youngstown Sheet and Tube Company, one of the largest steel manufacturers in the country, opened a headquarters complex in Boardman across from the DeBartolo Corporation. Here, a whole new "suburban" work environment was started; with a white shirt dress code, it was antiseptic and wholly removed from the dirt and grit of the steel mills farther north. When the Youngstown Sheet and Tube Company closed in 1977, a large campus was left for others to develop. Today, the former headquarters is the center of the Southwoods Health medical campus as well as a branch of Youngstown State University and various restaurants.

The fast food chain Arby's opened its first location in Boardman in 1964. The chain moved to a new building in the 1990s across the street from the original building on Route 224 next to St. Charles Borromeo Catholic Church where it currently operates. The Arby's is owned and operated by the now internationally known chain. The original building was occupied by a bird shop until 2021 and is now vacant.

The township has numerous listings on the National Register of Historic Places, including St. James Episcopal Church, the oldest structure in the township, Forest Lawn Memorial Park, Southern Park Stable, the Forest Glen Estates Historic District, the Mill Creek Park Historic District, and the Newport Village Historic District.

Geography

Centered at 41°2'20" North, 80°39'55" West in the central part of the county, it borders the following townships and municipalities:
Youngstown – north
Struthers – northeast
Poland Township and Poland – east
Springfield Township – southeast
Beaver Township – south
Canfield Township – west
Austintown Township – northwest corner

There are no incorporated communities within Boardman Township, although a portion of it was formerly listed as the census-designated place of Boardman until 2020. Parts of the village of Poland in the east and the city of Youngstown in the northeast occupy areas originally zoned to Boardman Township. Within Boardman, there are numerous neighborhoods, including the Newport Village Historic District.

Neighborhoods

Demographics

According to the 2019 American Community Survey and 2020 census, there were 40,213 people, 17,477 households, and 10,171 families residing in the township. The population density was  660.3 people per sq. km. The racial makeup of the township was 83.5% White, 7.51% African American, 1.82% Asian, 0.16% American Indian, 0.02% Pacific Islander, 1.23% from other races, and 5.72% from two or more races. Hispanic or Latino of any race were 4.76% of the population.

Economy

Boardman is a large, sprawling suburb. It is a busy community south of Youngstown composed of many businesses, being one of the main retail hubs of the Mahoning Valley. Its main competitor is the northern U.S. Route 422 "Strip" in Niles, Ohio, a similar suburb of Warren.

The primary corridor of development is along U.S. Route 224, with commercial space along almost the entirety of the township's length of the road except a portion zoned to Mill Creek Park. Running north-south, Ohio State Route 7 is also a primary artery of commercial development, with important centers such as the St. Elizabeth Boardman Hospital located along this route. At the intersection of Routes 7 and 224 lies Southern Park Mall, which is the largest single shopping destination in Mahoning County.  Furthermore, a new area of development is surging along the South Avenue artery which parallels the southern extension of Interstate 680 between its Midlothian and Western Reserve Road exits. The location of Boardman at the meeting point of several major local roadways allows it to be a center of commercial activity amongst the southern suburbs of the Youngstown–Warren area.

Boardman abuts one of the Youngstown area's most popular attractions, Mill Creek Park. Within the park grounds, there is an  rose garden, several small waterfalls, a lily pond with geese and turtles, marshlands, and Lanterman's Mill, where grain is ground daily. In addition, there is a 36-hole golf course.

Government
The township is governed by a three-member board of trustees, who are elected in November of odd-numbered years to a four-year term beginning on the following January 1. Two are elected in the year after the presidential election and one is elected in the year before it. There is also an elected township fiscal officer, who serves a four-year term beginning on April 1 of the year after the election, which is held in November of the year before the presidential election. Vacancies in the fiscal officership or on the board of trustees are filled by the remaining trustees. The board employs a township administrator for day-to-day administration of township services. The current members of the board of trustees are Brad Calhoun, Tom Costello, and Larry Moliterno, and the current township administrator is Jason Loree.

Education

The Boardman Local School District manages public education within most of the township and some surrounding areas. It consists of Boardman High School (grades 9–12), Boardman Glenwood Junior High School (grades 7–8), Boardman Center Intermediate School (grades 4–6), Robinwood Lane Elementary School, Stadium Drive Elementary School, and West Boulevard Elementary School (all K–3). Certain outlying areas of the township are managed by the Canfield Local School District, the Poland Local School District, and the Youngstown City School District.

Boardman is also home to a private school, namely the Catholic St. Charles School (grades K-8), although further private schools exist in neighborhoods of Youngstown that abut Boardman such as Valley Christian School (grades K-12) and the Montessori School of the Mahoning Valley (grades K-8).

Boardman has a public library, a branch of the Public Library of Youngstown and Mahoning County. 

Located in Boardman is also the Boardman Training Center, a post-secondary education facility that focuses on preparing students for healthcare certifications in months.

Notable people 
 Homer C. Blake, United States Navy flag officer
 Elijah Boardman, United States Senator from Connecticut and founder of Boardman Township
 Ricardo Condori, long-distance runner
 Dana DeLorenzo, actress, former radio personality and producer
 Terence Dials, former professional basketball player
 D. J. Durkin, American football coach, defensive coordinator at Texas A&M
 John Greco, former professional American football guard
 Elizabeth Hartman, actress
 Mary Ellen Kay, television and film actress
 Bernie Kosar, former professional American football quarterback best known for roles with the Cleveland Browns and Miami Dolphins
 Corey Linsley, professional American football center for the Los Angeles Chargers
 Maureen McGovern, singer and Broadway actress
 Norm Purucker, collegiate American football player
 Amy Salerno, member of the Ohio House of Representatives from the 23rd district
 Joe Schiavoni, judge, former Minority Leader of the Ohio Senate
 Jason Spitz, former professional American football center
 Sue Thomas, first deaf FBI agent, author
 Steve Vallos, former professional American football center

References

External links 
Township website
County website
Mill Creek MetroParks

Townships in Mahoning County, Ohio
Urban townships in Ohio
1806 establishments in Ohio
Townships in Ohio